Dunham Town is a village in the civil parish of Dunham Massey in the Metropolitan Borough of Trafford, Greater Manchester, England. It was historically a part of Cheshire.

History 
Dunham Town previously formed part of the parish of Bowdon, in the hundred of Bucklow.

Geography 
Dunham Town is in the Bowdon ward of the Metropolitan Borough of Trafford.

Neighbouring settlements include Altrincham, Bowdon, Dunham Woodhouses, Little Bollington and Partington.

Dunham Park lies to the south of the village. It was designated a site of special scientific interest in 1965 because of its biological content. Dunham Park has been  managed by the National Trust since 1976.

See also

Listed buildings in Dunham Massey

References

External links 

Trafford Metropolitan Borough Council

Villages in Greater Manchester
Geography of Trafford